Antaeotricha suffumigata is a moth of the family Depressariidae, described by Walsingham in 1897. It is endemic to Grenada.

The wingspan is 16–20 mm.

External links
West Indian Stenomidae (Lepidoptera: Gelechioidea)

Moths described in 1897
suffumigata
Moths of the Caribbean